Crucero is a village located between Bueno and Pilmaiquén River in Río Bueno commune, southern Chile.

References

Geography of Los Ríos Region
Populated places in Ranco Province